Kentucky Route 555 (KY 555) is a . north–south state highway that traverses three counties in the western part of central Kentucky's Bluegrass Region.

Route description
KY 555 begins in Springfield at intersections with U.S. Route 150 (US 150) and its business loop counterpart, US 150 Business (US 150 Bus.). It has a junction with KY 53 just west of Willisburg. It intersects the Bluegrass Parkway in rural northern Washington County. From there, the highway extends into Anderson County and terminates at an intersection with US 62 in a rural area of the southwestern section of the county southeast of Taylorsville Lake. KY 248 continues the high-quality road to KY 44 east of Taylorsville.

History
KY 555 is a relatively new route; it replaced a portion of KY 53 near its south end and was intended to provide better access to the Bluegrass Parkway eastbound.

Until the 2010-11 fiscal year, the Bluegrass Parkway interchange was KY 555's northern terminus. In the 2011-12 fiscal year, KY 555 was extended into southwestern Anderson County to end at its current northern terminus at US 62.

Major intersections

References

0555
0555
0555